Fliper is a Polish rock and punk rock band founded in Kielce in 1998. Fliper surprised local scene with catchy songs, ironic and funny lyrics and most of all funny image. The band has received many compliments as well as criticism after performing in the clothes of a priest, a nun and a Ku Klux Klan member (in green colour to stay away from the ideology of the organisation) during one of the first concerts. Fliper was also popular for using a rubber doll during their concerts at the beginning of their career. Fliper became more popular in 2002 when they released their debut album Wypas and MTV Polska, VIVA Polska and other music TV stations begun to air Fliper’s first videoclip “Kocham Cię i Kocham”, which was also the first single promoting the album. The third single from the album, which was a parody of the popular talent TV show Idol series, has encountered a big interest due to this fact. Fliper has given several hundred concerts around the country so far. The sound of the group is a mixture of guitar, bass and drums together with the brass section, consisting of a trumpet, trombone and occasionally saxophone. After three-year-long break they have returned in 2008 with a single “Wirtualna miłość” which has been supported by a videoclip. Prior to that Fliper was a regular guest to a popular TV show “Podróże z żartem” broadcast on TVP2 in 2006, 2007 and 2008.

Members 
 Łukasz “Łysy” Sobieraj – vocal, guitar
 Łukasz ”Trzeci” Zapała – drums
 Ąleksander „Olo” Gałgowski – bass
 Marcin „Chińczyk” Chlebny / Łukasz „Młody” Rakalski – trombone
 Bernard „Benek” Zdonek - trumpet
 Sebastian “Seba” Szczyrba - saxophone

Discography 

LP „Wypas” (2002)
Singles „Kocham cię i kocham”, „Angelika”, „Luzak”

LP „Róbmy swoje” (2003)
Singles „Agape”, „Poniedziałek”

Single „Odrodzony” (2005)

Single „Wirtualna miłość” (2008)

External links
Band’s official website

Polish punk rock groups